Francisco Rodríguez Pérez (1 June 1939 – 11 December 2021) was a Mexican politician. A member of the Institutional Revolutionary Party, he served in the Chamber of Deputies from 1973 to 1976 and again from 1982 to 1985, while briefly serving as President of the Chamber for one day in 1983.

References

1939 births
2021 deaths
People from Ciudad Juárez
Presidents of the Chamber of Deputies (Mexico)
Members of the Chamber of Deputies (Mexico)
Institutional Revolutionary Party politicians